ONPT was a Moroccan state-owned-industrial and economic institution. The body was in charge of all communications and telecommunications matters of Morocco.

In 1998, ONPT was divided into two entities; Maroc Telecom for everything related to telecommunications and Barid Al Maghrib for everything related to postal services.

See also
 Poste Maroc

References

Communications in Morocco
Telecommunications organizations
Organizations based in Morocco
Government-owned companies of Morocco
Government-owned telecommunications companies